This is a list of notable universities in Mali.

University of Bamako
University of Sankoré
University of Timbuktu

Mali
Mali
Universities